Romana D'Annunzio (born 14 January 1972) is an Italian-Scottish teacher and a former television presenter, who presented the children's programme Blue Peter from 1996 until 1998. Her co-presenters on the show were Tim Vincent, Stuart Miles, Katy Hill, Richard Bacon and Konnie Huq.

From 2004, D'Annunzio studied English and Italian at the University of Edinburgh and graduated with a MA, having also worked as an English teacher in Rome. D'Annunzio completed her post-graduate diploma in education at the University of Glasgow.

References

External links
 

Blue Peter presenters
Scottish television presenters
Scottish women television presenters
Scottish children's television presenters
Scottish people of Italian descent
1972 births
Living people
Television personalities from Edinburgh
Alumni of the University of Edinburgh
Alumni of the University of Glasgow
Teachers of English as a second or foreign language